Ebenezer is a 1998 Canadian made-for-television fantasy drama Western film starring Jack Palance and Ricky Schroder. It is a re-telling of Charles Dickens' classic 1843 novella A Christmas Carol with Jack Palance giving a performance as Ebenezer Scrooge, á la Western genre.

A TV film with high production value, it premiered in the United States on November 25, 1998 on TNT. It is an obscure and rarely seen title.

Plot
Ebenezer Scrooge is the most greedy, corrupt and mean-spirited crook in the old West and he sees no value in "Holiday Humbug." But when the ghosts of Christmas Past, Present and Yet to Come open his eyes, Scrooge discovers that love and friendships are the greatest wealth of all.

Featured cast

Home media
There were at least 2 DVD pressings produced. One was by Platinum Disc Corporation and the most recent by Lionsgate Home Entertainment in 2005, but not believed to be in general release at this time. The original VHS version is long out of print.

See also
 Adaptations of A Christmas Carol
 List of Christmas films

References

External links
 
Ebenezer Trailer atTV Guide.com

1998 television films
1998 films
1998 Western (genre) films
1990s fantasy drama films
Films based on A Christmas Carol
Television shows based on A Christmas Carol
TNT Network original films
Canadian Christmas films
English-language Canadian films
Canadian drama television films
Christmas television films
1990s Canadian films